Population censuses / by-censuses in Hong Kong are conducted by the Census and Statistics Department (C&SD) of the Hong Kong SAR Government. The aim is to provide up-to-date benchmark statistics on the demographic and socio-economic characteristics of the population and on its geographical distribution.  Since 1961, a population census has been conducted in Hong Kong every 10 years and a by-census in the middle of the intercensal period.  The last census, 2021 Population Census in Hong Kong was conducted by C&SD from 23 June to 4 August 2021.

Objectives
It is an established practice in Hong Kong to conduct a population census every 10 years and a population by-census in the middle of the intercensal period.  The next population census will be conducted in 2021.  The aim is to provide up-to-date benchmark statistics on the demographic and socio-economic characteristics of the population and on its geographical distribution.  Such statistics are vital to the Government for planning and policy formulation.  It is also important to the private sector and academia for business and research purposes.

Census and Statistics Ordinance
The Census and Statistics Ordinance, which was first effective in 1978, is the main law governing the work of the C&SD.  Under Section 9 of the Census and Statistics Ordinance, the Chief Executive in Council (Cap 316) makes a Census Order for each round of population census / by-census. 

Apart from the dates for conducting the population census, the Order specifies also the purpose of the census, the persons, premises and vessels in respect of which particulars are to be obtained, the persons who are required to give the requisite information, and the deadline for destroying the completed questionnaires.  A schedule specifying the matters in respect of which respondents are required to give particulars is included in the Order.

According to the Census and Statistics (2021 Population Census) Order, the Commissioner will take a census of population from 23 June 2021 to 4 August 2021 (both dates inclusive) and the Commissioner must destroy all completed schedules collected or received by census officers for the 2021 census, and all copies of the schedules, on or before 22 June 2022.

Data Collection Methods  
Two full censuses were held in Hong Kong in 1961 and 1971, and two sample censuses in 1966 and 1976.

In population censuses conducted since 1981, a simple enumeration on all households in Hong Kong has been carried out to provide basic information (e.g. year and month of birth and sex) and a detailed enquiry on a certain proportion of households to provide a broad range of demographic and socio-economic characteristics of the population.  Therefore, two types of questionnaire, namely the "Short Form" and the "Long Form", are used.  In the 2001 Population Census, one-seventh of the households completed the "Long Form".  Since the 2011 Population Census, around one-tenth of the households completed the "Long Form".

The design of population by-censuses is similar to that of population censuses, but a by-census differs from a census in not having a complete headcount of the population.  Instead, the detailed characteristics of the population are collected on the basis of a large sample.  The size and characteristics of the entire population are inferred from the sample results in accordance with appropriate statistical theory.  In other words, all households sampled for the by-census are required to provide detailed information about their demographic and socio-economic characteristics by completing the "Long Form".  A sample of about one-tenth of the residential addresses in Hong Kong was randomly selected for enumeration in the 2016 Population By-census, covering some 300 000 quarters.  Among the enumerated households, 82 500 (or 40.5%) chose to provide information online.

A multi-modal data collection approach will be used in the 2021 Population Census.

In the first phase, all households may provide the required information through the following means:
 online questionnaire;
 postal questionnaire with pre-paid return envelope ("Short Form" only); and
 telephone interview via the hotline 18 2021.

In the second phase of data collection, C&SD will arrange census officers to visit households that have not yet provided their information, and use mobile tablets to collect the required information.

Besides, for households residing on fishing boats, their number will be estimated based on aerial photos of all anchorages in Hong Kong Waters and their characteristics estimated based on information provided by the Agriculture, Fisheries and Conservation Department.  As for households residing on pleasure craft, notification letters will be sent to the sampled households to invite them to complete and submit online questionnaire.

Special arrangements will be made to enumerate some special groups of persons (called the special classes) who stay in places with restriction or difficulty of access.

In light of the evolving situation of COVID-19, C&SD will adopt contingency measures to reduce social contact.

Confidentiality
C&SD will not release respondents’ personal data to any unauthorised persons, including other Government departments.  Under the Census and Statistics Ordinance, it is an offence to disclose the particulars of individual persons or households to unauthorised persons.  All Temporary Field Workers will take an oath of secrecy, and will be stressed the importance of protecting data confidentiality and the legal consequence of improper handling of the data in their training.  All collected data, including those provided by households through the Internet and collected by census officers using mobile tablets, will be encrypted during transmission, and will only be stored and processed in designated area of C&SD.  The transient data in mobile tablets will also be encrypted and then deleted once uploaded.  Besides, all completed questionnaires, in both paper and electronic forms, will be destroyed within 12 months after the completion of the survey.

Data Topics

Summary Statistics

History

The first population census in Hong Kong could be traced back to 1841 when a full enumeration of persons in the villages on the Hong Kong Island was conducted. 

Since 1961, a population census has been conducted in Hong Kong every 10 years and a by-census in the middle of the intercensal period.

Population censuses were conducted in 1961, 1971, 1981, 1991, 2001, 2011 and 2021 while population by-censuses in 1966, 1976, 1986, 1996, 2006 and 2016.  The most recent population census was conducted from 30 June 2011 to 2 August 2011, while the most recent population by-census was conducted from 30 June 2016 to 2 August 2016.

See also
Census and Statistics Department (Hong Kong)
2021 Population Census in Hong Kong

References

  Census and Statistics Ordinance
  2001 Population Census - Summary Results 
  2006 Population Bycensus - Summary Results
  2011 Population Census - Summary Results
  2016 Population Bycensus - Summary Results
Major developments of the Census and Statistics Department（1967–2012）
 Preliminary Results of the 1981 Population Census
  2016 Population Bycensus - Technical Report

External links
2001 Population Census
2006 Population By-census
2011 Population Census
2016 Population By-census
2021 Population Census

Demographics of Hong Kong